Christine Allen is a Canadian professor and the first associate vice-president and vice-provost for strategic initiatives at the University of Toronto. She served formerly as interim dean of the university's Leslie Dan Faculty of Pharmacy. She is co-founder of Nanovista, a company focused on imaging of tumors. She also works as the associate editor of Molecular Pharmaceutics.

Education and career 
Allen earned a Bachelor of Science degree in biochemistry from the University of Ottawa and a PhD in chemistry from McGill University. She completed a post doc in the Department of Advanced Therapeutics at the BC Cancer Agency.

Career 
Prior to joining the University of Toronto in 2002 she worked as a scientist and assistant directors of materials research at Celator Pharmaceuticals. Allen's research is focused on the field of drug delivery, in particular, micelles and gold nanoparticles for cancer therapy. She has developed several block-co-polymers, particularly those with PEG, for delivery of cancer chemotherapeutics. For cancer imaging as well as theranostic applications, the Allen lab has developed several gold nanoparticle carriers.

Awards and recognition 
Her platforms apply concepts in drug delivery, targeted drug delivery, as well as controlled release. She has numerous patents, over 90 publications, and has received many awards including:
 Fellow of the Canadian Academy of Health Sciences
2014 Gattefossé Canada/CSPS Award in Lipid-Based Drug Delivery
 2011 CRS/Elsevier Journal of Controlled Release Jorge Heller Award for Outstanding Paper
 Innovation Award - Ontario Research and Commercialization Program, 2008
 Career Award - Canadian Institutes of Health Research (CIHR)/Rx&D, 2004-2009
 New Investigator Research Award - Association of Faculties of Pharmacy of Canada (AFPC)/AstraZeneca, 2006
 Early Career Award - Canadian Society for Pharmaceuticals Sciences (CSPS)/GlaxoSmithKline, 2006

References

Academic staff of the University of Toronto
Cancer researchers
Year of birth missing (living people)
Living people
Canadian pharmacologists